The Turf Monster Stakes is a Grade III American Thoroughbred horse race for three years old or older, over a distance of five furlongs on the turf held annually in September at Parx Casino and Racing racetrack in Bensalem, Pennsylvania.  As of 2019, the event currently carried a purse of $300,000.

History 
The race was inaugurated on May 27th, 2002 with an attractive purse offered of $100,000 as the Turf Monster Handicap. 

In 2011 the event was upgraded to a Grade III.

The event has attracted fast sprinters from the East Coast of the US, including Pure Sensation, who won this event four times and Ben's Cat who won this event twice.

The race was not held in 2020 due to the COVID-19 pandemic. In 2021 the ten-year-old Hollywood Talent finished with a late surge and won by  lengths at odds of 108-1, but the horse was later disqualified after drug testing found the prohibited substance levamisole.

Records
Speed record: 
 5 furlongs – 55.53  - Smart Enough  (2007)
 
Margins: 
  lengths – Worldwind Romance (2005)
 
Most wins by a jockey  
 4 – Kendrick Carmouche  (2008, 2015, 2017, 2018)

Most wins by a trainer
 4 – Christophe Clement (2015, 2017, 2018, 2019)

Most wins by an owner
 4 – Patricia A. Generazio (2015, 2017, 2018, 2019)

 Winners of Parx Dash Stakes – Turf Monster Stakes double
 Ben's Cat (2012),  Pure Sensation (2017, 2019)

Winners 

Notes:

† In 2021, Hollywood Talent finished first but was later disqualified due to a medication violation.

See also
 List of American and Canadian Graded races

References 

Graded stakes races in the United States
Horse races in Pennsylvania
Grade 3 stakes races in the United States
Recurring sporting events established in 2002
Turf races in the United States
Parx Casino and Racing
2002 establishments in Pennsylvania